Lau Kar-leung (28 July 1934 – 25 June 2013), was a Chinese actor, filmmaker, choreographer, and martial artist from Hong Kong. Lau is best known for the films he made in the 1970s and 1980s for the Shaw Brothers Studio. His most famous works include The 36th Chamber of Shaolin starring Gordon Liu as well as Drunken Master II starring Jackie Chan.

History
Lau began learning kung fu when he was nine years old, under strict tutelage from his father. Before becoming famous, Lau worked as an extra and choreographer on black and white Wong Fei-hung movies. He teamed up with fellow Wong Fei-hung choreographer  on the 1963 Hu Peng-directed wuxia film South Dragon, North Phoenix. Their collaboration would continue on until the mid-1970s. His first appearance in a film was in Brave Lad of Guangong (1950).

In the 1960s he became one of Shaw Brothers' main choreographers and had a strong working relationship with director Chang Cheh, working on many of Chang's films as a choreographer (often alongside Tong Gaai) including The One-Armed Swordsman, as well as other Shaw Brothers wuxia films, such as The Jade Bow. After a split with Chang on the set of Marco Polo, Lau evolved into a director during the sudden boom of martial arts films in the early 1970s. He occasionally did choreography work for non-Shaw films as well, such as Master of the Flying Guillotine.

After Shaw Brothers collapsed in the 1980s, Lau moved on and continued directing and choreographing films, among them Drunken Master II. However, the film's star Jackie Chan and director Lau clashed over the style of fighting, resulting in Lau leaving the set before the shooting of the final fight scene, which was then taken over by Chan. Most recently, Lau performed acting and choreography work for Tsui Hark's 2005 film Seven Swords.

Mark Houghton opened the Lau Family Hung Kuen school Lau Family Hung Gar academy in Hong Kong / Fanling with the support of his sifu, Lau. He gave his disciple the permission to spread the art of Lau Family Hung Kuen to chosen students. There are already branches in England, Philippines, and China.

Collaborations with Gordon Liu
Lau's most frequent collaborator is likely his "god brother" Gordon Liu Chia Hui, and he worked with Liu on a number of films, directing him as a star in the now classic The 36th Chamber of Shaolin (1978), as well as directing Liu as either a star or cast member in Dirty Ho (1979), Eight-Diagram Pole Fighter (1983), Executioners from Shaolin (1977), Return to the 36th Chamber (1980), Heroes of the East (1978), Legendary Weapons of China (1982), Disciples of the 36th Chamber (1985), Tiger on Beat (1988), Tiger on the Beat 2 (1990), Shaolin Warrior (1980), Spiritual Boxer II (1979), Cat vs Rat (1982), The Lady is the Boss (1983),  My Young Auntie (1981), Challenge of the Masters (1976), Shaolin Mantis (1978), The Martial Club (1981), and Drunken Monkey (2003). They also appeared together as themselves in the Italian documentary "Dragonland" (2009, directed by Lorenzo De Luca).

Screenplays
Throughout his career, Lau only wrote four screenplays, but they were all for films that he himself directed. Those screenplays/films are My Young Auntie (1981), Legendary Weapons of China (1982), The Lady is the Boss (1983) and Eight-Diagram Pole Fighter (1983). All of the films also starred or featured Gordon Liu in some role or capacity.

Awards and nominations
In 2005, Lau won a "Best Action Choreography" award at the Golden Horse Award for his action choreography work on Tsui Hark's Seven Swords.  He also won another Golden Horse Award in 1994, for "Best Martial Arts Direction" in the film Drunken Master II (or The Legend of the Drunken Master).  In 1995, Lau also won a "Best Action Choreography" award at the Hong Kong Film Awards for his choreography in Drunken Master II and in 1997, the film won "Best Film" at the Fantasia Film Festival. Lau was also nominated for a "Best Action Choreography" Hong Kong Film Award in 2006 for his work on Tsui Hark's Seven Swords, and nominated in 1983 for a "Best Action Choreography" Hong Kong Film Award for his work on Legendary Weapons of China (1982), which he also directed and wrote.

In 2010, Lau was honored with a Lifetime Achievement Award at the Hong Kong Film Awards for his contributions to the martial arts film genre.

Personal life
Lau was the third child of Lau Cham (Lau Jaam, 劉湛), a martial arts master who studied Hung Gar under Lam Sai-wing, a student of Wong Fei-hung. He has a brother who makes a living in the film industry, actor/choreographer Lau Kar-wing, as does Gordon Liu, Lau's pupil and adopted godson to Lau's father, Lau Cham. His nephew Lau Kar-Yung (son of his older sister) is also an actor, choreographer and director. Another nephew, Lau Wing-kin (Lau Kar-wing's son) is also an actor, and assisted Lau Kar-leung with action-directing Seven Swords

Lau began training students Hung Gar before the age of 5 and was already quite proficient in the style. Bruce Lee treated Lau as an elder uncle and asked him for advice in regards to his film career.

As his acting career went smoothly, his family began to worry about his marriage. On seeing that Liu had reached the marriageable age and there was no suitable woman around him, they introduced him to a woman named Ho Sau-ha (何秀霞). However Lau only had interest in his acting career but proceed with the marriage anyway, they had four daughters and one son.

In 1978 Lau first met the then 14 years old Mary Jean Reimer who was 30 years his junior and was a fan of his and Lau helped Reimer in establishing her acting career.

After divorcing his first wife and leaving the family, Lau married Reimer in 1984 and they had two daughters, Jeanne and Rosemary Lau.

Death
Lau died on 25 June 2013 at Union Hospital, Hong Kong. He had been battling leukemia for two decades.

Filmography

Films 
 1973 Breakout from Oppression - Director
 1975 The Spiritual Boxer - Director
 1976 Challenge of the Masters - Director
 1977 Executioners From Shaolin - Director
 1978 36th Chamber of Shaolin - Director
 1978 Shaolin Mantis - Director
 1978 Heroes of the East - Director
 1979 The Spiritual Boxer II - Director
 1979 Dirty Ho - Director
 1979 Mad Monkey Kung Fu - Director
 1980 My Young Auntie - Director
 1980 Return to the 36th Chamber - Director
 1981 Martial Club - Director
 1982 Legendary Weapons of China - Director, writer
 1982 Cat vs Rat - Director. 
 1983 Lady Is The Boss - Director
 1984 The Eight Diagram Pole Fighter - Director, writer
 1985 Disciples of the 36th Chamber - Director, writer
 1986 Martial Arts of Shaolin - Director
 1988 Tiger on the Beat - Director
 1989 Aces Go Places 5: The Terracotta Hit - Director
 1990 Tiger on the Beat II - Director
 1994 Drunken Master II - Director
 1994 Drunken Master III - Director
 2002 Drunken Monkey - Director

As a martial arts choreographer

As an actor

Brave Lad of Guangdong (1950)
Huang Fei Hong yi gun fu san ba (1953) - Ah-Biu
Huang Fei Hong wen zhen si pai lou (1955)
Huang Fei Hong: Da nao Fo Shan (1956)
Huang Fei Hong huo shao Daoshatou (1956) - Monkey Kwong
Huang Fei Hong san xi nu biao shi (1956)
Huang Fei Hong yi jiu long mu miao (1956)
Huang Fei Hong nu tun shi er shi (1956) - Chiu Chung Bo
Huang Fei Hong: Tie ji dou wu gong (1956) - Child
Huang Fei Hong long zhou duo jin (1956)
Huang Fei Hong Shamian fu shen quan (1956)
Huang Fei-hong gong chuan jian ba (1956)
Huang Fei Hong yong jiu mai yu can (1956) - Hing's Man 1
Wu Song xue jian shi zi lou (1956)
Huang Fei Hong Guanshan da he shou (1956) - Thug
Huang Fei Hong gu si jiu qing seng (1956)
Bi xue en chou wan gu qing (1956)
Bai hao ying xiong chuan (1956)
Huang Fei Hong shui di san qin Su Shulian (1956)
Huang Fei Hong da nao hua deng (1956) - Kwok To
Huang Fei Hong: Tian hou miao jin xiang (1956) - Elder
Na Zha nao dong hai (1957) - 3rd Prince Dragon King
Huang Fei Hong Henan yu xie zhan (1957)
Huang Fei Hong shi wang zheng ba (1957) - Leung-chai
Huang Fei Hong die xie ma an shan (1957)
Huang Fei Hong da po fei dao dang (1957)
Huang Fei-hong xie jian su po wu (1957) - Pirate
Huang Fei Hong: Ye tan hei long shan (1957)
Huang Fei Hong long zheng hu dou (1958)
Huang Fei Hong lei tai dou wu hu (1958) - Shining Tiger
Huang Fei Hong fu qi chu san hai (1958)
Huang Fei Hong hu xue jiu Liang Kuan (1958)
Story of the White-Haired Demon Girl (1959)
Huo zang Lan Tou He (1959) - Disciple #2
Huang Fei Hong bei kun hei di yu (1959)
Huang Fei Hong hu peng fu hu (1959)
Bai fa mo nu zhuan san ji da jie ju (1959)
Huang Fei Hong lei tai zheng ba zhan (1960) - Lackey
Nazha sheshan jiu mu (1960) - Mu Cha
Xing xing wang da zhan Huang Fei Hong (1960) - Clawtooth 1
Huang Fei Hong yuan da po wu hu zhen (1961) - Clawtooth 1
Tai ping tian guo nu ying xiong (1961)
Xian he shen zhen (1961)
Kun lun qi jian dou wu long (1961)
Fu gui rong hua di yi jia (1962)
Lian huan mou sha an (1962) - Shot Thug (uncredited)
Ru yan jing hun (1962) - Detective Lee
Huo yan shan (1962)
Na zha san dou hong hai er (1962) - Muk Cha
Yue Fei chu shi (1962)
Huang mao guai ren (1962) - Teddy boy
Xi xue shen bian (1963)
Huo shao gong lian si Shang ji (1963) - Lau Chee
Huo shao gong lian si Xia ji (1963)
Yi tian tu long ji xia ji (1963)
Guai xia yan zi fei (1963)
Nan long bei feng (1963)
Luoyang qi xia zhuan (1964)
Bai gu li hun zhen shang ji (1964)
Bai gu li hun zhen xia ji (1964)
Ru lai shen zhang shang ji (1964)
Wan bian fei gu (1964) - Monkey of North Mountain
Pan Jin Lian (1964)
Qing xia qing chou (1964)
Yi di xia yi xue shang ji (1965)
Da di er nu (1965)
Dao jian shuang lan (1965)
Qing chang yi geng chang (1965)
999 Shen mi shuang shi an (1965) - Kidnapper
Bao lian deng (1965)
Zhui ziong ji (1965)
Temple of the Red Lotus (1965)
Hei mei gui (1965) - Rascal
Yuan yang jian xia (1965)
Tit gim jyu han seung jaap (1965)
Yun hai yu gong yuan (1966)
Nu sha shou (1966)
Bian cheng san xia (1966)
Nu xiu cai (1966)
Sheng huo xiong feng da po huo lian zhen (1967)
Yu nu jin gang (1967)
Duan chang jian (1967)
Nu tan hei tian e (1967) - Scoundrel
Qin Jian En Chou (1967)
Shen jian zhen jiang hu (1967)
Jin ou (1967) - Henchman
One-Armed Swordsman (1967) - Pa Shuang
Mi ren xiao niao (1967)
Mao yan nu lang (1967)
Dao jian (1967)
Nu jin gang da zhan du yan long (1967)
Qi xia wu yi (1967) - Hsiang brother #1
Da ci ke (1967)
Wu di nu sha shou (1967)
Yu mian fei hu (1968)
Golden Swallow (1968) - Golden Dragon Branch Leader
Fang Shi Yu san da mu ren xiang (1968)
Fei xia xiao bai long (1968)
The Sword of Swords (1968)
Du bei dao wang (1969) - 'Ape Arms' Yuan Chen
Shi er jin qian biao (1969)
The Flying Dagger (1969)
Shen da (1975)
Challenge of the Masters (1976) - Chen Erh-fu
Executioners from Shaolin (1977) - 3-Sectional Staff Fighter
Heroes of the East (1978) - Drunken Master Su (Guest star)
Mad Monkey Kung Fu (1979) - Chen
Wu guan (1981) - Lion dance instructor
My Young Auntie (1981) - Yu Ching-Chuen
Legendary Weapons of China (1982) - Lei Kung
Heroic Family (1983)
Lady Is the Boss (1983) - Wang Hsia Yuan
Invincible Pole Fighter (1984) - Hunter
Disciples of the 36th Chamber (1985)
Evil Cat (1987) - Master Cheung
Heng cai san qian wan (1987) - Liang
A Bloody Fight (1988) - Leung
Pedicab Driver (1989) - Gambling House Boss
Hak do fuk sing (1989) - Wong
New Kids In Town (A.K.A New Killers In Town) (1990) - Uncle
The Banquet (1991) - Master Lau / Uncle Nine
The Twin Dragons (1992) - Doctor
Operation Scorpio (1992) - Master Lo
Drunken Master II (1994) - Master Fu Wen-Chi
Drunken Master III (1994) - Uncle Yan
Drunken Monkey (2002) - Master Man Bill
Seven Swords (2005) - Fu Qingzhu (final film role)

External links

Hong Kong Cinemagic: Lau Kar Leung

References

1934 births
2013 deaths
Shaw Brothers Studio
Chinese Hung Gar practitioners
Hong Kong male film actors
Hong Kong film directors
Hong Kong martial artists
Male actors from Guangzhou
Sportspeople from Guangzhou
Male actors from Guangdong
Chinese male film actors
Chinese male television actors
20th-century Chinese male actors
20th-century Hong Kong male actors